Gentlemen! is a platform game developed and published by Lucky Frame for iOS, Ouya, Microsoft Windows, OS X, and Linux in 2013.

Reception

The iOS version received "favorable" reviews according to the review aggregation website Metacritic.

References

External links
 

2013 video games
IOS games
Linux games
MacOS games
Ouya games
Platform games
Video games developed in the United Kingdom
Windows games
Single-player video games